Hassoma Bino Bamba (born 21 December 1990 in Bondoukou) is an Ivorian footballer who plays as a defensive midfielder. Previously he has played for his home country club AS Athlétic Adjamé, and for Iraklis and Apollon Kalamarias in Greece.

Club career
Hassoma Bino Bamba started his career in AS Athlétic Adjamé. On 29 August 2013 he signed for Greek Football League outfit Iraklis. He debuted for Iraklis on 30 September 2013 in an away loss against Kavala. In February 2015 he joined Apollon Kalamarias. He debuted for his new club in a 5–0 home win against Zakynthos.

References 

1990 births
Living people
People from Bondoukou
Ivorian footballers
Ivorian expatriate footballers
Iraklis Thessaloniki F.C. players
FF Jaro players
Jakobstads BK players
Kakkonen players
Ykkönen players
Association football midfielders
Expatriate footballers in Finland
Ivorian expatriate sportspeople in Finland
Expatriate footballers in Greece
Ivorian expatriate sportspeople in Greece